The Ace of Wands is a tarot card of the Minor Arcana, arcana being Latin for mysteries. The cards of the Minor Arcana are considered to be lesser compared to the Major Arcana because they discuss the minor mysteries of life, less important archetypes.  Modern tarot readers interpret the Ace of Wands as a symbol of optimism and invention.

Introduction
Tarot's pictorial symbolism embodies intellectual, moral, and spiritual ‘lessons’ constituting collective human experiences across times, places and cultures. Tarot establishes this much sought after connection between ‘self’ and
‘other’ akin to the famous ‘I-Thou’ relation in Martin Buber’s metaphysics.

The ace card in a deck is considered the trump card. This card in a reading signifies success in all aspects. The success is backed by luck. This combination of success backed by hard work and luck is what forms the basis of the Ace card in the Tarot deck.

The element of the wands suit is fire. The key words are Passion, New Ventures, Success, good luck. Therefore, wands are enthusiastic, inspirational, and spiritually minded. Wands correspond to the zodiac signs Aries, Leo, and Sagittarius.
The four suits, related to the modern hearts, clubs, diamonds, and spades, are swords, cups, pentacles, and wands.

An Ace-Ace pair shows that a new spirit is entering one's life. It draws on the energy of the Ace of Wands: creativity, excitement, adventure, courage, personal power.

History
The Minor Arcana consists of the suit cards. The leading French occultist of the late 19th and 20th centuries, who wrote under the name of Papus, rebuked certain of his colleagues for using only the Major Arcana for divination, and insisted that the entire pack is essential; and all occult theories of those whom Papus rebuked were in better accord than he with the true facts of the matter. The suit cards are in no way special to the tarot pack; its inventor can have imbued it at most the trump card with esoteric meanings, since the others were not of his invention, but only rather faithful copies of the Islamic cards from which European ones were derived.

Ace of Wands Dictionary
Arrien-The Torch of Fire. A deep spiritual desire and opportunity for self-discovery and self-realization that the individual has to draw upon for a year's time.

Cowie-New Idea. Having a new thought.

Crowley-The Root of the Powers of Fire. The essence of the element of Fire in its inception. The primordial Energy of the Divine manifesting in Matter at so early a stage that it is not yet definitely formulated as Will.

Eakins-Force. Transformative high energy. Great energy of new beginnings. A newly discovered source of power. Excitement. Exhilaration.

Fairfield-A New Identity. Planting the seeds for a new, public identity. Beginning to create a new name for oneself or taking on a new role in life.

Greer-Inspired consciousness. Consciousness Raising. Desire for self-growth. New idea. Burst of energy. The first impulse and the passionate will to begin.

Noble-The beginning of fire-spirit, intuition, energy. A rebirth of the spirit. The passions are aroused and creativity is assured. Expansive activity and willpower for whatever one's goals dictate.

Pollack-A gift of strength, power, great sexual energy, and the love of living. Or chaos and things falling apart.

Sharman-Burke-Positive new beginnings and ideas in the element of fire. Creativity, energy and initiative. Can symbolize a new business venture, a new undertaking, new foundation, and creative power with plenty of potential and ambition to progress and succeed.

Stewart-Fire/Light. In one sense the burning flame, while in a higher octave universal light, the energy of being. A balancing, affirmed power, an energy increasing in potency. The god of light in harmony and balance with the dragon power.

Waite-Creation, invention, enterprise, the powers which result in these; principle, beginning, source; birth, family, origin, and in a sense of virility which is behind them, The starting point of enterprises; money, fortune, inheritance. (The card) represents the critical factor for the seed of a new venture - perhaps as yet unseen. An opportunity to be met with boldness, vigor, and enthusiasm. The herald of birth, invention, or entrepreneurship. An innate and primal force released. Also, it may suggest a surge of vitality, creativity, or fertility that can set things in motion.

Walker-Power. Power and the masculine element of fire with its connotations of heat, vigor, aspiration, contest, enlightenment, and avidity to consume.

Wanless-Illumination. Purity, clarity, and honesty. State of enlightenment. Understanding. Having the courage to change and expand. Knowing what gives one energy and vitality.

Riley-Evokes the Force. Unseen self-organizing. The Spirit rising up from within. The drawing of desire, passion, enthusiasm, creativity. Indicates some form of I desire.

Card Description/Mythological Image
There are different versions of the Ace of Wands as well as different interpretations of their meaning.

One is that a hand comes out from a cloud holding a flowering wand. In the distance is a mountain peak surmounted by a castle.

Another says that the image found on the Ace of Wands card is the rod with which Moses used to strike the water out of the rock or the club of Hercules.

How the Ace of Wands relates to life

Upright
When the Ace of Wands appears upright, readers often interpret a call for creativity and ambition.

Reversed 
If the Ace of Wands appears reversed, it is often taken as circumstances delaying progress.

Work 
Tarot readers often interpret the Ace of Wands as a sign of new and positive future, especially in the area of occupation.

Love 
If the reader is single, this card may be seen as the indication of the beginning of a new romantic relationship. If one is already committed, the Ace tells that the relationship will undergo a 'new beginning,' and those in it will rise to new levels of understanding each other.

Finances
The appearance of this card has been interpreted as the sign of a turn for the better in terms of fortune and wealth, and sometimes it can even indicate gifts of money, or inheritance from unexpected sources.

Health 
Readers often see this card as alluding to new, positive levels of health and vitality.

Spirituality  
As mind and body are closely linked, this card can indicate a new spiritual influence coming into one's life.

Key symbols to the ace of wands Tarot card meanings
Clouds: Symbol meaning of clouds deal with ambiguity, mystery, and things hidden. Most renditions of this card depict a hand holding a flaming torch thrust out suddenly from the clouds. This is symbolic of our ideas or energy coming out of the hidden places of our psyche and into the light of day. Clouds often deal with hidden agendas that might be keeping us in a holding pattern. They may also indicate underlying beliefs that hold us back from our being our brightest selves.

Rivers: River symbol meanings deal with motion, direction, and the flow of our thoughts as well as our lives. When the river in the ace of wands Tarot card flows into our psychic vision it is a message that we must consider the direction we are taking in our lives. Specifically, since the ace of wands deals with passion and energy, we may want to consider where our actions are taking us. Take the time to reassess one's goals and be confident one is heading in the life direction desired.

Mountains: Symbol meanings of mountains deal with challenges, acquisition, accomplishment and aspirations. Mountains are a symbolic allegory for us in that as we climb them, each step brings us closer to our highest point. This highest point, the top of the mountain, can be a spiritual goal, physical goal, or anything else that we aspire to reach. The mountain is unbending, and inflexible. This makes it a reminder that only we can change how we deal with challenges (because the mountain certainly isn't going to change for us). This being the case, we can embrace the lessons we gain as we take on the challenge of the mountain. We can also rest assured that the peak will always be there as we aspire ever higher to our desired results.

Key Meanings
The key meanings of the Ace of Wands:
Birth
Commencement
Creativity
Inventiveness
New Beginnings

References

Huson, Paul, (2004) Mystical Origins of the Tarot: From Ancient Roots to Modern Usage, Vermont: Destiny Books,  Mystical Origins of the Tarot

Further reading
Banzhaf, Hajo. The Tarot Handbook. Stamford, CT: U.S. Games Systems, 1993. Print.

Decker, Ronald, Thierry Depaulis, and Michael A. E. Dummett. A Wicked Pack of Cards: the Origins of the Occult Tarot. New York: St. Martin's, 1996. Print.

Gray, Eden. The Tarot Revealed: a Modern Guide to Reading the Tarot Cards. New York: Bell Pub., 1960. Print.

Ivtzan, Itai. "Tarot Cards: A Literature Review and Evaluation of Psychic versus Psychological Explanations." Journal of Parapsychology (2007): 139-40. Print.

Shepard, Leslie. Encyclopedia of Occultism and Parapsychology: a Compendium of Information on the Occult Sciences, Magic, Demonology, ... with Biographical and Bibliographical Notes and Comprehensive Indexes. Detroit, MI: Gale, 1991. Print.

Semetsky, Inna. "Transforming Ourselves/transforming Curriculum: Spiritual Education and Tarot Symbolism." International Journal of Children's Spirituality 14.2 (2009): 105-20. Print.

Riley, Jana. Tarot Dictionary and Compendium. York Beach, Me.: Samuel Weiser, 1995. Print.

External links

Suit of Wands